West Harrison High School is a public high school located in Gulfport, Mississippi, United States. Opened in 2008, it includes a reinforced storm shelter with a 2000-person capacity built as part of a $9 million FEMA grant. The principal is Dana Trochessett.

The West Harrison High School Hurricane Band, The Pride of South Mississippi was selected to march down Colorado Blvd. in Pasadena, CA for the 2020 Rose Parade. This marks the second time in twenty years that a high school band from Mississippi to participate in the parade.

References

Gulfport, Mississippi
Public high schools in Mississippi
Schools in Harrison County, Mississippi